Enrique Fernández Arbós (24 December 1863 – 2 June 1939) was a Spanish violinist, composer and conductor who divided much of his career between Madrid and London. He originally made his name as a virtuoso violinist and later as one of Spain's greatest conductors.

Career
Fernández Arbós was born in Madrid. After studying violin at the Madrid Conservatory under Jesús Monasterio, he continued his studies in Brussels under Henri Vieuxtemps and later in Berlin under Joseph Joachim. While in Berlin he also studied composition under Heinrich von Herzogenberg. After teaching at the Madrid Conservatory and in Hamburg, with spells as leader of the Berlin Philharmonic Orchestra and Boston Symphony Orchestra, he became professor of violin at the Royal College of Music, London, in 1894, a post he occupied until 1916. In 1904, he was offered the position of principal conductor of the Madrid Symphony Orchestra, a position he held for nearly 35 years.

His many pupils included Maud MacCarthy (later Omananda Puri), the wife of the composer John Foulds.

He conducted the first Spanish performance of Igor Stravinsky's The Rite of Spring   and of Richard Strauss's Don Quixote (1915; with Juan Ruiz Casaux, cello).

He enjoyed a successful solo career but was also engaged as concertmaster of several orchestras including those of Berlin, Boston, Glasgow and Winnipeg. He guest conducted the St. Louis Symphony in 1929. He was also credited for the invention of the electric triangle  .

He died in San Sebastián.

Music
As a composer, Arbós is probably best known for his piano trio Tres Piezas Originales en Estilo Español. His violin pieces also enjoyed considerable popularity. In addition to these works, he wrote a zarzuela, El Centro de la Tierra (1895), which, for a brief period after its publication, was frequently performed in Spain. His orchestral arrangements of five pieces from Isaac Albéniz's Iberia are well known. In 1928, with the Madrid Symphony Orchestra, he recorded three of these, along with pieces by Manuel de Falla, Enrique Granados, Joaquín Turina, and himself; these recordings have been issued on compact disc by Dutton.

References

 
 Everyman Dictionary of Music ed. Eric Blom, 6th edition (London: J. M. Dent, 1974), 
 A Dictionary of Modern Music and Musicians, general editor Arthur Eaglefield Hull (London: J. M. Dent, 1924)
 Some of the information in this article appears on the website of Edition Silvertrust but permission to use this text under the GNU Free Documentation License has been given, and this documentation provided to Wikipedia

External links
Sound-bite from Tres Piezas Originales for piano trio & short bio

1863 births
1939 deaths
19th-century Spanish male musicians
20th-century conductors (music)
Academics of the Royal College of Music
Male classical violinists
Male conductors (music)
Musicians from Madrid
Players of the Berlin Philharmonic
Spanish classical composers
Spanish classical violinists
Spanish conductors (music)
Spanish male classical composers
Spanish music educators
Spanish Romantic composers
Violin pedagogues